Craniscus is a genus of small brachiopods (lamp shells). The shell is approximately round to square with one side rounded. The ventral valve is approximately flat and attached to the underground by the entire surface. The outside of the dorsal valve is more or less conical, the inside is divided by three ridges that join in the center.

References

Brachiopod genera
Extant Late Jurassic first appearances
Craniata